Lotz Cisterns (the spelling Loz is used, too) is an archaeological site in Negev Mountains, Israel, where 17 ancient water cisterns are located. Of those, about 8 are still filled with water after winter rains.

The cisterns are spread over an area of two square kilometers in the vicinity of Mount Ramon. At the site, there is also an ancient pistacia atlantica tree. During the winter and spring months, numerous flowers grow in the area, primarily around sources of water.

The first research on the sites was performed by Nelson Glik in the 1950s. The cisterns were rarely visited by Israelis until they became accessible by road in the 1980s. In 1980, following the peace agreement with Egypt, interest in the Negev began to grow. Route 171 was paved to the site, where archaeological excavations and restoration was conducted in cooperation with moshav members. Until these excavations, the prevailing view, introduced by archaeologist Yohanan Aharoni, had been that the cisterns were dug during the reign of Solomon, and that they were in use until the Babylonian Captivity. However, with the discovery of Canaanite artifacts at the site, many began to believe that the cisterns are even older.

Because the site is located in one of the most isolated regions in Israel, and as a result has little light pollution, it is a popular spot for amateur astronomy.

References 

Archaeological sites in Israel